Arcady Sergeevich Boytler Rososky (August 31, 1895 – November 24, 1965) was a Russian-born Mexican film producer, director and screenwriter, most renowned for his films during the golden age of Mexican cinema.

Boytler was born in Moscow, Russia. During the 1920s, he started filming silent comedies. A collaborator of Sergei Eisenstein, he was called "the Russian Rooster" when he came to Mexico to film La mujer del puerto (1933). In 1937 he filmed ¡Así es mi tierra!, which followed the model of Fernando de Fuentes's classic Allá en el Rancho Grande. However, the film subverted the Mexican Revolutionary genre by making the general into the villain.

Boytler died of heart disease in the Mexican Federal District on November 24, 1965, at the age of 70.

Filmography

Cinema of Mexico 
 Como yo te quería (1944) producer
 Amor prohibido (1944) director, producer and screenwriter
 Una luz en mi camino (1938) (special appearance)
 El capitán aventurero (Don Gil de Alcalá) (1938) director and screenwriter
 Heads or Tails (1937) director and screenwriter
 ¡Así es mi tierra! (1937) director and screenwriter
 Celos (1935) director, screenwriter, and editor
 El tesoro de Pancho Villa (1935) director, screenwriter, and editor
 Revista musical (1934) director (short subject)
 La mujer del puerto (1933) director and supervising editor
 Joyas de México (Gems of Mexico) (1933) director (series of three short films)
 Mano a mano (1932) director and screenwriter
 Un espectador impertinente (1932) director, actor and screenwriter (short subject)
 ¡Que viva México! (1930–32) extra (during the party scene)

Cinema of Chile 
 El buscador de fortuna (No hay que desanimarse) (1927) director and actor

Cinema of Germany 
 Boytler Tötet Langeweile (Boytler contra el aburrimiento/Pasatiempos de Boytler/Boytler against boredom) (ca. 1922) actor and director
 Boytler gegen Chaplin (Boytler contra Chaplin/Boytler against Chaplin) (ca. 1920) actor and director (short subject)

Cinema of Russia 
 Arkadij Controller Spalnych Vagonov (ca. 1915) actor and director
 Arkadij Zhenitsa (ca. 1915) actor and director
 Arkadij Sportsman (ca. 1915) actor and director

References

External links 
 
  Arcady Boytler at the ITESM Mexican cinema site

1895 births
1965 deaths
20th-century Mexican male writers
20th-century Mexican screenwriters
Russian film directors
Soviet emigrants to Mexico
Russian Jews
Mexican film directors
Mexican film producers
Mexican Jews
Mass media people from Moscow